Hivaoa may refer to

Hiva Oa, the second largest island in the Marquesas Islands
Hiva-Oa, the administrative commune which includes the island of Hiva Oa
Hivaoa, a junior synonym of the spider genus Glenognatha